Red in Tooth and Claw is the sixth studio album by Norwegian metal band Madder Mortem, released on 28 October 2016 on Dark Essence Records. It is the genre-defying quintet's first new full-length album since 2009.

Track listing

Personnel 
Madder Mortem
Agnete M. Kirkevaag – lead vocals
BP M. Kirkevaag – guitars, mandolin, backing vocals
Richard Wikstrand – guitars
Tormod L. Moseng – bass guitar, double bass, backing vocals
Mads Solås – drums, percussion, backing vocals

Guitars on "Red in Tooth and Claw" performed by BP M. Kirkevaag & Patrick Scantlebury

Production
Produced by BP M. Kirkevaag and Madder Mortem
Engineered by BP M. Kirkevaag
Mixed by BP M. Kirkevaag
Mastering – Peter In de Betou

Reception 
Angrymetalguy.com rates the album 4.0/5.0:
"Madder Mortem's style is not easy to describe succinctly; switching effortlessly from crushing grooves to uncomfortable dissonance to quiet contemplation or soaring beauty, they are experts at manipulating your emotions with their skillful song-craft. The one-two punch of "Blood on the Sand" and "If I Could" that open the record showcase the Madders at their emotive peak, with off-kilter timing and uncomfortable harmonies building towards dramatic releases of tension. Though each runs for over five minutes, the shimmering guitars and arpeggiated bass-lines create a continuous sense of motion meaning that neither seems too long."

References 

2016 albums
Madder Mortem albums